Chichester District Council in West Sussex, England is elected every four years. Since the last boundary changes in 2003, 48 councillors have been elected from 29 wards.

Political control
Since the first election to the council in 1973 political control of the council has been held by the following parties:

Leadership
The leaders of the council since 1999 have been:

Council elections
1973 Chichester District Council election
1976 Chichester District Council election
1979 Chichester District Council election (New ward boundaries)
1983 Chichester District Council election
1987 Chichester District Council election (District boundary changes took place but the number of seats remained the same)
1991 Chichester District Council election
1995 Chichester District Council election (District boundary changes took place but the number of seats remained the same)
1999 Chichester District Council election
2003 Chichester District Council election (New ward boundaries reduced the number of seats by 2)
2007 Chichester District Council election
2011 Chichester District Council election
2015 Chichester District Council election
2019 Chichester District Council election (New ward boundaries reduced the number of seats by 12)

By-election results

1995–1999

1999–2003

2003–2007

2007–2011

2011–2015

References

 By-election results

External links
Chichester District Council

 
Chichester District
Council elections in West Sussex
District council elections in England